The United Kingdom of Great Britain and Northern Ireland competed as Great Britain at the 1952 Winter Olympics in Oslo, Norway.

Medallists

Alpine skiing

Men

Women

Figure skating

Women

Pairs

Speed skating

Men

References

 Olympic Winter Games 1952, full results by sports-reference.com

Nations at the 1952 Winter Olympics
1952
Olympics
Winter sports in the United Kingdom